Raymond A. "Razor" Watkins (September 23, 1892 – December 13, 1972) was an American football and ice hockey coach. He served as the head football coach at Bates College in 1921. In 1928, he returned to his alma mater, Colgate University, to serve as the head ice hockey coach, a position he held from 1928 to 1932.

Head coaching record

Ice hockey

References

External links
 

1892 births
1972 deaths
American football quarterbacks
Bates Bobcats football coaches
Colgate Raiders football coaches
Colgate Raiders football players
Colgate Raiders men's ice hockey coaches
High school football coaches in New Jersey